Samuel Edwin Beetley (November 23, 1913 – September 15, 1988) was an American film editor. He received two Academy Award nominations for his works in The Longest Day (1962) and Doctor Dolittle (1967). Beetley also won two Primetime Emmy Awards from seven nominations.

Selected filmography

As editor
 The Toast of New York (1937)
 Army Surgeon (1942)
 Sunset Pass (1946)
 Child of Divorce (1946)
 Out of the Past (1947)
 Return of the Bad Men (1948)
 Race Street (1948)
 The Clay Pigeon (1949)
 The Big Steal (1949)
 The White Tower (1950)
 Hunt the Man Down (1951)
 Macao (1952)
 The Longest Day (1962)
 The Visit (1964)
 Doctor Dolittle (1967)
 Soylent Green (1973)
 The Blue Knight (1973) (TV)
 Bad Ronald (1974) (TV)
 Sherlock Holmes in New York (1976) (TV)
 Five Days from Home (1978)

References

External links

1913 births
1988 deaths
Artists from San Antonio
American film editors
Primetime Emmy Award winners